Raúl González (born 1977), known as Raúl, is a retired Spanish footballer.

Raúl González may also refer to:

Otto-Raúl González (1921–2007), Guatemalan writer, lawyer and communist
Raul A. Gonzalez (born 1940), Justice of the Supreme Court of Texas
Raul M. Gonzalez (1931–2014), Secretary of Justice of the Philippines from 2004 to 2009
Raúl González (baseball) (born 1973), Major League Baseball player
Raúl González (boxer) (born 1967), Cuban Olympic medalist in boxing
Raúl González (footballer, born 1955), Chilean football defender
Raúl González (footballer, born 1976), Argentine football striker
Raúl González (footballer, born 1985), Venezuelan football right-back
Raúl González (footballer, born 1991), Spanish football forward
Raúl González (footballer, born 1994), Puerto Rican football midfielder
Raúl González (football manager, born 1952), Uruguayan football manager
Raúl González (football manager, born 1968), Chilean football manager
Raúl González (handballer) (born 1970), Spanish handball player
Raúl González (host) (born 1971), Venezuelan host on the Univisión television network
Raul Gonzalez (journalist) (1935–2013), Filipino journalist and columnist
Raúl González (racewalker) (born 1952), Mexican Olympic medalist in race walking
Raúl González (weightlifter) (born 1957), Cuban Olympic weightlifter